Mahatsara Sud is a rural municipality in Madagascar. It belongs to the district of Mananjary, which is a part of Vatovavy. The population of the commune was estimated to be approximately 2,000 in 2001 commune census.

Only primary schooling is available. The majority 99.5% of the population of the commune are farmers.  The most important crops are cassava and rice, while other important agricultural products are coffee and lychee. Services provide employment for 0.5% of the population.

References 

Populated places in Vatovavy